Matthias Strohmaier (born 11 March 1994) is a German professional footballer who plays as centre-back for VfB Hallbergmoos.

Honours
FC Vaduz
Liechtenstein Football Cup: 2016-17

References

External links
 

1994 births
Living people
German footballers
Association football defenders
Germany youth international footballers
Regionalliga players
Swiss Super League players
FC Augsburg II players
FC Bayern Munich II players
FC Vaduz players
German expatriate sportspeople in Liechtenstein
Expatriate footballers in Liechtenstein
1. FC Schweinfurt 05 players
VfR Garching players
German expatriate footballers
German expatriate sportspeople in Switzerland
Expatriate footballers in Switzerland